Lake Andes National Wildlife Refuge Complex consists of the Lake Andes National Wildlife Refuge, the Lake Andes Wetland Management District and the Karl E. Mundt National Wildlife Refuge. Altogether, 89,454 acres (362.01 km2) of U.S. Government and easement lands are managed by the complex. The complex is headquartered at Lake Andes, South Dakota and is a part of the U.S. Fish and Wildlife Service.

References

External links
 

National Wildlife Refuges in South Dakota
Nature centers in South Dakota